King of tha Supa Dupa Hyphy is an official mixtape album released by Keak da Sneak. It is hosted by DJ Rick Lee.

Track listing
"On Citas"- 2:25  
"Super Hyphy"- 2:20  
"Contact Sport"- 1:57  
"Grand Daddy Cali"- 1:50  
"I Cop Back"- 1:59  
"Yadda Wha Wha"- 1:59  
"Hyphy Wifee"- 3:03  
"I Feed My Bitch"- 2:05  
"Muscle Cars"- 2:29  
"Cus Cus"- 2:20  
"Show Me the Deer Foot"- 2:14  
"Sk's Ak's"- 2:04  
"Hello Buddy"- 3:04  
"Know My Name"- 2:06  
"Touch on Me Touch on You"- 2:23  
"Flamboastin Gennessee"- 1:29  
"Thighs, Legs, Breast & Biscuits"- 2:06  
"What Does It All Mean"- 2:26  
"Club Talk"- 2:27  
"Like Yee"- 2:07  
"She's in Da Building Yall"- 3:34  
"Tell Me When to Go Trackademics"- 2:25
"On Citas"- 3:34  
"I A'int Playin"- 2:26  
"I'm Not Listenin"- 3:24  
"I Can't Stop It"- 1:46  
"Scrapin"- 2:22  
"Like Damn!!!"- 2:54  
"What Up"- 1:59
"Freaks"- 2:39  
"Know What I'm Sayin"- 1:56  
"White T-Shirt Blue Jeans & Nikes"- 2:47  
"Keep It Goin"- 3:40

Keak da Sneak albums
2006 compilation albums